Recipe to Riches is an Australian television reality show that screened on Network Ten from 27 August 2013. It involves cooks from around the country, competing to have their recipe become a brand product in supermarkets. Competitors cook their dishes, create a brand for their product and devise strategies to launch it to the public. The contestants are mentored by Carolyn Creswell, owner of Carman's Fine Foods, David Nobay, an advertising industry expert, and chef Darren Robertson. The mentors are joined by a representative from Woolworths supermarkets to decide the winning product, which will by made available for sale in Woolworths the day after the episode airs. The winner of the whole series receive $100,000 and a partnership with Woolworths.

The show is based on the Canadian reality television show, Recipe to Riches.

Season 1 was won by Garth Midgley with his product Chocorn on 12 November 2013.
Season 2 was won by Michael Cainero with his Chunky Pork and Apple Sausages on 9 December 2014.

Experts

Season 1

References

Network 10 original programming
2013 Australian television series debuts
2014 Australian television series endings
2010s Australian reality television series
Australian cooking television series
Television series by Fremantle (company)
English-language television shows